Komovi may refer to:

FK Komovi, a Montenegrin football club
, a Yugoslav cargo ship in service 1965-67
Komovi Mountains, a mountain range in Montenegro